The lachter (also Berglachter) was a common unit of length used in the mining industry in Europe, usually to measure depth, tunnel driving and the size of mining fields; it was also used for contract work. In most German-speaking mining fields it was the most important unit of length.

A lachter was roughly equal to the amount which a man could contain within his outstretched arms. It was thus similar to the klafter (ca. ), but was usually rather larger.

The lachter was - with regional differences - subdivided into Achtel (also called a Spann, Gräpel or Gröbel), (Lachter)Zoll, Primen (or Prinen) and Sekunden:

 1 lachter = 8 Spann = 80 (Lachter)Zoll = 800 Primen = 8,000 Sekunden

In the 19th century a decimal system of subdivision was established:

 1 lachter = 10 Lachterfuß = 100 Lachterzoll = 1,000 Lachterlinien

Like other units of measure, the lachter varied in length depending on the region, but there could also be differences in length within the same region. In addition there could also be differences between various mining fields within a territory. The specification and use of conversion tables only makes sense if it is known for certain, where and at which times the values were valid. Some examples:

A Lachterschnur was an oiled, 10–12 Lachter long cord, used as a measuring device.

See also 
 List of human-based units of measure
 List of obsolete units of measurement
 Obsolete Austrian units of measurement
 Obsolete German units of measurement

References

Sources 
 
 

Mining terminology
Obsolete units of measurement
Timber rafting
Units of length
History of mining
Units of measurement of the Holy Roman Empire